On 14 April 2013 Nicolás Maduro was elected President of Venezuela, narrowly defeating opposition candidate Henrique Capriles with just 1.5% of the vote separating the two candidates. Capriles immediately demanded a recount, refusing to recognize the outcome as valid. Maduro was later formally inaugurated as President on 19 April, after the election commission had promised a full audit of the election results. On 24 October 2013, he announced the creation of a new agency, the Vice Ministry of Supreme Happiness, to coordinate all the social programmes.

Rule by decree 
Beginning six months after being elected, Maduro has ruled by decree for the majority of his presidency: from 19 November 2013 to 19 November 2014, 15 March 2015 to 31 December 2015, 15 January 2016 to present.

2013–2014 
In October 2013, Maduro requested an enabling law to rule by decree in order to fight corruption and to also fight what he called an "economic war". On 19 November 2013, the National Assembly granted Maduro the power to rule by decree until 19 November 2014.

2015–2016 
On 10 March 2015, Maduro asked to rule by decree for a second time following the sanctioning of seven Venezuelan officials by the United States, requesting the Enabling Law to be used to "confront" what Maduro called "the aggression of the most powerful country in the world, the United States". Days later on 15 March 2015, the National Assembly granted Maduro power to rule by decree until 31 December 2015.

2016–2017 
After a coalition of opposition parties won in the 6 December 2015 elections, the lame duck Assembly named 13 new Justices sympathetic toward Maduro to the Supreme Court. On 15 January 2016, Maduro declared an economic emergency and issued a "vaguely worded" decree that would grant himself extraordinary powers for 60 days, or until 15 March 2016. Days after on 18 March 2016, the expiration of the decree powers, the Supreme Court granted Maduro the power to rule by decree for an additional 60 days, or until 17 May 2016.

Days before his second 60-day rule by decree were to end, Maduro stated on 11 May 2016 that he would continue to rule by decree through the rest of the year until 2017.

2017–2018 
While meeting with the Supreme Tribunal of Justice on 15 January 2017, Maduro signed a new economic decree, extending his rule by decree for the sixth time since the original ruling in January 2016. On 19 January, the Supreme Tribunal of Justice established the "Decree on the State of Emergency and Economic Emergency", granting Maduro to rule by decree further into 2017.

On 13 May 2017 at a time of rising unrest during the 2017 Venezuelan protests, President Maduro extended his decree powers for the eighth time since January 2016, allowing him to rule by decree for another 60 days. The powers were extended again on 13 July 2017 for an additional 60 days.

On 15 October The Bolivarian government Great Patriotic Pole won 18 of the 23 governorships while the opposition only 5 during the 2017 Venezuelan regional elections

On 10 December - The Bolivarian government Great Patriotic Pole won 306 of the 337 Mayorships during the 2017 Venezuelan municipal elections.

Cabinet of Maduro

Military authority

Maduro has relied on the military to maintain power since he was initially elected into office. According to Luis Manuel Esculpi, a Venezuelan security analyst, "The army is Maduro's only source of authority." As time passed, Maduro grew more reliant on the military, showing that Maduro was losing power as described by Amherst College professor, Javier Corrales. Corrales explains that "From 2003 until Chavez died in 2013, the civilian wing was strong, so he did not have to fall back on the military. As civilians withdrew their support, Maduro was forced to resort to military force." The New York Times states that Maduro no longer has the oil revenue to buy loyalty for protection, instead relying on favorable exchange rates, as well as the smuggling of food and drugs, which "also generate revenue".

On 12 July 2016, Maduro granted Defense Minister Vladimir Padrino López the power to oversee product transportation, price controls, the Bolivarian missions, while also having his military command five of Venezuela's main ports. This action performed by President Maduro made General Padrino one of the most powerful people in Venezuela, possibly "the second most powerful man in Venezuelan politics". The appointment of Padrino was also seen to be similar to the Cuban government's tactic of granting the Cuban military the power to manage Cuba's economy. It is the first time since the dictatorship of General Marcos Perez Jimenez in 1958 that a military official has held such power in Venezuela. According to Corrales, "For all of the ministers of the cabinet to have to respond to a soldier, this is associated with military dictatorships".

According to Nicolás Maduro:

Domestic policy

Maduro denies that Venezuela has been facing a humanitarian crisis. Maduro stuck to his predecessor Hugo Chávez's policies in order to remain popular to those who find a connection between the two. Despite the increasingly difficult crises facing Venezuela, such as a faltering economy and high crime rate, Maduro continued the use of Chávez's policies.

After continuing Chávez's policies, Maduro's support among Venezuelans began to decrease, with Bloomberg explaining that he held on to power by placing opponents in jail and impeding upon Venezuela's freedom of press. According to Marsh, instead of making any policy changes, Maduro placed attention on his "hold on power by closing off the legal channels through which the opposition can act". Shannon K. O'Neil of the Council on Foreign Relations stated that "After Chavez's death, Maduro has just continued and accelerated the authoritarian and totalitarian policies of Chavez".

Regarding Maduro's ideology, Professor Ramón Piñango, a sociologist from the Venezuelan University of IESA, "Maduro has a very strong ideological orientation, close to the Communist ideology. Contrary to Diosdado, he is not very pragmatic". Maduro himself has stated that Venezuela must build a more socialist nation, highlighting that the country needs an economic overhaul, a political-military union and government involvement in the workplace.

Crime 

One of the first important presidential programs of Maduro became the "Safe Homeland" program, a massive police and military campaign to build security in the country. Three thousand soldiers were deployed to decrease homicide in Venezuela, which has one of the highest rates of homicide in Latin America. Most of these troops were deployed in the state of Miranda (Greater Caracas), which has the highest homicide rate in Venezuela. According to the government, in 2012, more than 16,000 people were killed, a rate of 54 people per 100,000, although the Venezuela Violence Observatory, a Venezuelan NGO, claims that the homicide rate was in fact 73 people per 100,000. The program had to be reinitiated one year later after the program's creator, Miguel Rodríguez Torres, was replaced by Carmen Melendez Teresa Rivas. Murder also increased over the years since the program's initiation according to the Venezuela Violence Observatory, with the murder rate increasing to 82 per 100,000 in 2014. 23,047 homicides were committed in Venezuela in 2018, a rate of 81.4 per 100,000 people.

Economic 

When elected in 2013, Maduro continued the majority of existing economic policies of his predecessor Hugo Chávez. When entering the presidency, Maduro's Venezuela faced a high inflation rate and large shortages of goods that was left over from the previous administration of President Chávez.

Maduro blamed wealthy businessmen for hoarding goods and speculation that is driving high rates of inflation and creating widespread shortages of staples, and often said he was fighting an "economic war", calling newly enacted economic measures "economic offensives" against political opponents he and loyalists state are behind an international economic conspiracy. However, Maduro has been criticized for only concentrating on public opinion instead of tending to the practical issues economists have warned the Venezuelan government about or creating any ideas to improve the economic situation in Venezuela such as the "economic war".

Venezuela was ranked as the top spot globally with the highest misery index score in 2013, 2014, and 2015 In 2014, Venezuela's economy entered an economic depression that has continued as of 2017. Under Maduro’s rule, GDP has approximately halved.

Military 
Maduro has relied on the military to maintain power since he was initially elected into office. He has promised to make Venezuela a great power by 2050, stating that the Venezuelan military would lead the way to make the country "a powerhouse, of happiness, of equality".

On 12 July 2016, Maduro granted Defense Minister Vladimir Padrino López the power to oversee product transportation, price controls, the Bolivarian missions, while also having his military command five of Venezuela's main ports. This action performed by President Maduro made General Padrino one of the most powerful people in Venezuela, possibly "the second most powerful man in Venezuelan politics". The appointment of Padrino was also seen to be similar to the Cuban government's tactic of granting the Cuban military the power to manage Cuba's economy.

According to Nicolás Maduro:It was the first time since the dictatorship of General Marcos Pérez Jiménez in 1958 that a military official has held such power in Venezuela.

Foreign policy 

Maduro has accused the United States of intervention in Venezuela several times with his allegations ranging from post-election violence by "neo-Nazi groups", economic difficulties from what he called an "economic war" and various coup plots. The United States has denied such accusations while analysts have called such allegations by Maduro as a way to distract Venezuelans from their problems.

In early 2015 the Obama administration signed an executive order which imposed targeted sanctions on seven Venezuelan officials whom the White House argued were instrumental in human rights violations, persecution of political opponents and significant public corruption and said that the country posed an "unusual and extraordinary threat to the national security and foreign policy of the United States". Maduro responded to the sanctions in a couple of ways. He wrote an open letter in a full page ad in The New York Times in March 2015, stating that Venezuelans were "friends of the American people" and called President Obama's action of making targeted sanctions on the alleged human rights abusers a "unilateral and aggressive measure". Examples of accusations of human rights abuses from the United States to Maduro's government included the murder of a political activist prior to legislative elections in Venezuela. Maduro threatened to sue the United States over an executive order issued by the Obama Administration that declared Venezuela to be a threat to American security. He also planned to deliver 10 million signatures, or signatures from about 1/3 of Venezuela's population, denouncing the United States' decree declaring the situation in Venezuela an "extraordinary threat to US national security". and ordered all schools in the country to hold an "anti-imperialist day" against the United States with the day's activities including the "collection of the signatures of the students, and teaching, administrative, maintenance and cooking personnel". Maduro further ordered state workers to apply their signatures in protest, with some workers reporting that firings of state workers occurred due to their rejection of signing the executive order protesting the "Obama decree". There were also reports that members of Venezuelan armed forces and their families were ordered to sign against the United States decree.

On 6 April 2015, twenty-five (25) ex-presidents issued a Declaración de Panamá, a statement denouncing the VII Cumbre de las Américas, what they called "democratic alteration" in Venezuela, promoted by the government of Nicolas Maduro. The statement calls for the immediate release of "political prisoners" in Venezuela. Among the former heads of government that have called for improvements in Venezuela are: Jorge Quiroga (Bolivia); Sebastián Piñera (Chile): Andrés Pastrana, Álvaro Uribe and Belisario Betancur (Colombia); Miguel Ángel Rodríguez, Rafael Ángel Calderón Guardia, Laura Chinchilla, Óscar Arias, Luis Alberto Monge (Costa Rica), Osvaldo Hurtado (Ecuador); Alfredo Cristiani and Armando Calderón (EL Salvador); José María Aznar (Spain); Felipe Calderón and Vicente Fox (México), Mireya Moscoso (Panamá), Alejandro Toledo (Perú) and Luis Alberto Lacalle (Uruguay).

Maduro has reached out to China for economic assistance while China has funneled billions of dollars from multiple loans into Venezuela. China is Venezuela's second largest trade partner with two-thirds of Venezuelan exports to China composed of oil. According to Mark Jones, a Latin American expert of the Baker Institute, China was "investing for strategic reasons" rather than ideological similarities. The Venezuelan military has also used military equipment from China using the NORINCO VN-4 armoured vehicle against protesters during the 2014–15 Venezuelan protests, ordering hundreds more as a result of the demonstrations.

At the 17th Summit of the Non-Aligned Movement (NAM) in 2016, hosted by Venezuela at Margarita Island, Maduro was elected chairperson by acclamation, a position that he is to hold until the 18th Summit in Azerbaijan in 2019. Maduro's administration spent over US$120 million on the event, and Maduro billed it as a meeting that would "be remembered for centuries"; according to Al Jazeera, the "delegates who did come complained privately of a lack of organisation, delays and shabby hotels". The Maduro administration did not respond to a request from Al Jazeera for a list of delegations present; of the 120 NAM member states, media sources estimated between 10 and 15 heads of state attended, including Bolivia, Cuba, Ecuador, Palestine, Iran, Syria and Zimbabwe. For only the second time since NAM was founded, India did not attend; of the countries that did attend, many are recipients of Venezuelan oil subsidies, according to Foreign Policy and Fox News.

In the Israeli–Palestinian conflict, Maduro has frequently supported the Palestinian cause in international forums including his stance that his country recognizes Jerusalem as the eternal capital of Palestine after the US embassy move to Jerusalem which he called an "extremist decision" that lacks legal validity and violates international law. In January 2019, Maduro reaffirms the unconditional support for the struggle of the Palestinians in defense of their sovereignty in accordance with the principles of the Charter of the United Nations and international law.

In December 2017, Maduro was invited as the special honorary guest at the Extraordinary Summit of the OIC (Organisation of Islamic Cooperation) in Istanbul, Turkey with the main issue being to unify the response of the Muslim world to the US embassy move to Jerusalem, which Maduro called a "colonial act."

On 11 August 2017, President Donald Trump said that he is “not going to rule out a military option” to confront the government of Nicolás Maduro. On 23 January 2019, Maduro announced that Venezuela was breaking ties with the United States following President Trump's announcement of recognizing Juan Guaidó, the Venezuelan opposition leader, as the interim President of Venezuela.

On 14 January 2019, days after Brazil recognised Venezuelan opposition leader Juan Guaidó as the country's interim president, Maduro called Brazilian President Jair Bolsonaro “a Hitler of the modern era”.

2014–present: Venezuelan protests 

Since 2014, a series of protests, political demonstrations, and civil insurrection began in Venezuela due to the country's high levels of violence, inflation, and chronic shortages of basic goods attributed to economic policies such as strict price controls. Maduro's government saw the protests as an undemocratic coup d'etat attempt orchestrated by "fascist opposition leaders and the United States".

Although Maduro, a former trade union leader, says he supports peaceful protesting, the Venezuelan government has been widely condemned for its handling of the protests. Venezuelan authorities have reportedly gone beyond the use of rubber pellets and tear gas to instances of live ammunition use and torture of arrested protestors, according to organizations like Amnesty International and Human Rights Watch, while the United Nations has accused the Venezuelan government of politically-motivated arrests, most notably former Chacao mayor and leader of Popular Will, Leopoldo Lopez, who has used the controversial charges of murder and inciting violence against him to protest the government's "criminalization of dissent."

Protests dwindled through 2015 and into 2016, though a movement to recall Maduro rekindled anti-government sentiment among Venezuelans, culminating with over one million protesting nationwide on September 1, 2016. Protests since then have continued, especially due to controversies surrounding the recall movement and the continued socioeconomic hardships Venezuelans face on a daily basis.

Recall referendum
The process to hold a recall referendum to vote on recalling Maduro was started on May 2, 2016. On that date, opposition leaders in Venezuela handed in a petition to the National Electoral Council (CNE) that started a several stage process. As of July 2016, the Venezuelan government had stated that if enough signatures were collected, a recall vote would be held no sooner than 2017.

Initial petition
On May 2, 2016, opposition leaders in Venezuela handed in a petition calling for a recall referendum. On June 21, 2016, the BBC reported that signatures for a referendum to recall Maduro were being recorded by the National Electoral Council (CNE), with the process ongoing for several days. The petition required 1% of the electorate to endorse it before the next stage of voting could be held.
According to opposition leaders, in July during a preliminary signature drive for the recall, the CNE "rejected more than half a million signatures for reasons ranging from unclear handwriting to smudged fingerprints."

In early July 2016, Barack Obama urged Venezuela to allow the recall referendum. On July 5, 2016, the Venezuelan intelligence service detained five opposition activists involved with the recall referendum, with two other activists of the same party, Popular Will, also arrested.

According to a July 27, 2016 article in The Guardian, "Venezuela's opposition has demanded authorities move forward on a referendum to force Nicolás Maduro from office, amid complaints that the government is digging in its heels to delay the process."  Several days before protests on the issue at the headquarters of the CNE had been held after the CNE missed a deadline on announcing whether a recent petition had collected enough valid signatures. The government, in response, argued the protestors were part of a plot to topple Maduro. At the time, a poll by Venebarómetro reportedly found that "88% of 'likely' voters in a recall would choose to oust Maduro."

Second phase of the referendum
On August 1, 2016, the CNE announced that enough signatures had been validated for the recall process to continue. A date was not set by the CNE for the second phase to take place, which requires raising 20 percent of the electorates' signatures. While opposition leaders pushed for the recall to be held before the end of 2016, allowing a new presidential election to take place, the government vowed a recall would not occur until 2017, ensuring the current vice president would potentially come to power. Reuters reported that the government had launched 9,000 lawsuits alleging fraud in signature collection by that time.

On August 9, 2016, the CNE presented a timeline for the referendum that made it unlikely it would be held before the end of 2016, in part due to a new 90-day verification period for signatures. The second stage of the petition was estimated by the CNE to likely take place in October 2016, resulting in a vote likely happening in February 2017. Opposition leaders were reported to be planning a large protest march in response, with leaders accusing the CNE of favoring the incumbent Socialist Party with the wait time. According to Reuters on August 9, "Socialist Party leaders have dismissed the recall effort as fraudulent and noted that the elections council found nearly 10,000 signatures corresponding to people who were deceased."

Early on September 21, 2016,  the National Electoral Council set new guidelines for the recall campaign that The Associated Press described as "unfavorable to the opposition." Among other rules, officials announced that signatures would need to be gathered from 20 percent of Venezuelan voters over three days, specifically October 26 until October 28. In addition, officials required campaigners to gather 20 percent from the electorate in each state, although "opposition leaders say they should only have to gather signatures from 20 percent of voters nationwide." The opposition, which had asked for 20,000 voting machines, was granted 5,400 by officials. On September 21, 2016, the National Electoral Council announced the recall referendum would not be held before January 10, meaning new elections would be ruled out in favor of the VP assuming Maduro's place until the end of the term in 2019. The CNE said that the vote "could be held in the middle of the first quarter of 2017."

Suspension of referendum
 
On 21 October 2016, the CNE suspended the referendum only days before preliminary signature-gatherings were to be held. The CNE blamed alleged voter fraud as the reason for the cancellation of the referendum.

Reaction
Opposition leaders responded by calling on protests against the CNE's actions. The day after the government's announcement, several thousand Venezuelans marched through Caracas protesting against the suspension. Demonstrators were led by Lilian Tintori and Patricia Gutiérrez, wives of arrested opposition politicians.

Experts described the suspension as "unconstitutional". Venezuelan constitutional law expert Jose Vicente Haro stated that the move by the Bolivarian government shows no respect for the constitution while the Washington Office on Latin America called the suspension "a setback for democracy".

International reactions
Reuters reported on August 4, 2016 that U.S. Secretary of State John Kerry had stated that "we encourage Venezuela to embrace the recall not in a delayed way that pushes it into next year, but to do this as a sign of respect for the constitution of the country and the needs of the people of the country." On August 11, 2016, 15 countries in the Organization of American States released a joint statement urging for the referendum to be held "without delay," to "contribute to the quick and effective resolution of the current political, economic and social difficulties in the country."

Overthrow attempts
On 3 May 2020 Venezuelan security forces prevented an attempt to overthrow Maduro by armed deserters from Venezuela’s security forces. The attempt, named Operation Gideon, was organised by former United States Army Special Forces operator Jordan Goudreau and the men were trained in Colombia. Goudreau claimed the operation had involved 60 troops, including two former US special forces members. The Venezuelan government claimed the United States and its Drug Enforcement Administration (DEA) were responsible for the operation and had support from Colombia. Juan Guaidó denied involvement in the operation, however, Goudreau claimed that Guaidó and two political advisers had signed a contract with him for $213 million in October 2019.

See also

 2004 Venezuelan recall referendum
 Venezuelan protests (2014-present)

References

External links

2013 in Venezuela
2014 in Venezuela
2015 in Venezuela
2016 in Venezuela
Crisis in Venezuela
Politics of Venezuela